W San Francisco  is a 31-floor,  highrise luxury boutique hotel in San Francisco, California located next to the San Francisco Museum of Modern Art and across from Moscone Center. The tower was constructed by Webcor Builders and opened in 1999. The building was the tallest concrete-framed structure in San Francisco until The Paramount was completed three years later. The hotel contains 401 rooms operated by W Hotel, which is under the same operator (Marriott International) as the nearby St. Regis Museum Tower.

See also

List of tallest buildings in San Francisco

References

External links
W San Francisco

 

San Francisco
Hotel buildings completed in 1999
Skyscraper hotels in San Francisco
Hotels established in 1999
1999 establishments in California
South of Market, San Francisco